Josef Sara (born 9 March 1954) is an Austrian footballer. He played in one match for the Austria national football team in 1979.

References

External links
 

1954 births
Living people
Austrian footballers
Austria international footballers
Place of birth missing (living people)
Association footballers not categorized by position
Footballers from Vienna
Association football defenders
Favoritner AC players
Floridsdorfer AC players
FK Austria Wien players